Eri Cahyadi (born 27 May 1977) is an Indonesian politician and bureaucrat who serves as Mayor of Surabaya since 26 February 2021. He was elected in the 2020 Surabaya mayoral election.

Career
Cahyadi graduated with a degree in civil engineering from the Sepuluh Nopember Institute of Technology in 1999, and after a 2-year career as a consultant he began working for Surabaya's municipal government in 2001. Both his parents had previously also worked as government officials.

By 2011, Cahyadi had been promoted to head the city government's public housing and urban planning department, and in 2018, he was appointed to head the municipal development planning body, in addition to heading the department of sanitation and public spaces. In order to run in the 2020 mayoral election, Cahyadi resigned as a civil servant and became a cadre of PDI-P. Cahyadi, who was endorsed by incumbent mayor Tri Rismaharini, won the election with over 57 percent of votes.

References

1977 births
Living people
Indonesian Democratic Party of Struggle politicians
Indonesian civil servants
People from Surabaya
Sepuluh Nopember Institute of Technology alumni
Mayors of Surabaya